The Picture Company is an entertainment company founded in 2014, by Andrew Rona and Alex Heineman. It specializes in film, starting off moderately in 2018 with Jaume Collet-Serra's The Commuter and Albert Hughes' Alpha.

History

Founding
The Picture Company was founded in 2014 by film veterans Andrew Rona and Alex Heineman. Rona is a former president at Silver Pictures and Rogue Pictures, and Heineman was an EVP at Silver Pictures.

The company began in 2014 with a first-look deal with StudioCanal. The company achieved its first theatrical releases with Jaume Collet-Serra's The Commuter, Albert Hughes' Alpha, and Sam Taylor-Johnson's A Million Little Pieces.

Future projects
Since September 2014, The Picture Company has announced several projects which have not yet been realised, including the adaptation of Mitch Swenson's The Tracking Of A Russian Spy, for which Nima Nourizadeh replaced Pierre Morel as director and Logan Lerman and Olivia Cooke were in talks to star. Also announced were Nottingham & Hood, a Pirates Of The Caribbean-style Robin Hood movie for Walt Disney Studios Motion Pictures, the Escape from New York remake for 20th Century Fox. as well as the movie version of David-Jan Bronsgeest's short film Meet Jimmy, with Platinum Dunes also producing for Paramount Pictures. Also pending are Harry Bradbeer's film The Paris Trap, for StudioCanal and David Bruckner's film Out There, for Entertainment One.

Filmography

Released

Upcoming films

See also

 STX Entertainment
 Neon
 Amazon Studios
 Annapurna Pictures
 Blumhouse Productions 
 Studio 8

References

Film production companies of the United States